Augusto Riboty was one of three s built for the  (Royal Italian Navy) during World War I.

Design and description
The ships were designed as scout cruisers (esploratori), essentially enlarged versions of contemporary destroyers. Their complement was 8 officers and 161 enlisted men.

The Mirabellos were powered by two Parsons geared steam turbines, each driving one propeller shaft using steam supplied by four Yarrow boilers.

Augusto Ribotys main battery consisted of a single Cannone da /40 A Modello 1891 gun forward of the superstructure. The gun was backed up by seven Cannone da /35 S Modello 1914 guns in single mounts protected by gun shields, one  aft the superstructure and the remaining guns positioned on the broadside amidships. Anti-aircraft (AA) defense for the Mirabello-class ships was provided by a pair of Cannone da /40 Modello 1916 AA guns in single mounts. They were equipped with four  torpedo tubes in two twin mounts, one on each broadside. Augusto Riboty could carry 120 mines, although her sisters could only handle 100.

Modifications
The gun proved to be too heavy for the ships and its rate of fire was too slow so it was replaced when the ships were rearmed with eight Cannone da 102/45 S, A Modello 1917 guns arranged with single guns fore and aft of the superstructure and the other on the broadside. The 76 mm guns were replaced by a pair of Cannone da /39 AA guns in single mounts in 1920–1922.

Citations

Bibliography

External links
 Augusto Riboty Marina Militare website

Mirabello-class destroyers
Ships built in Genoa
Ships built by Gio. Ansaldo & C.
1916 ships
World War II destroyers of Italy
Maritime incidents in September 1943
Destroyers of the Soviet Navy